Congreso is a station on Line A of the Buenos Aires Underground. It lies at the intersection of Rivadavia and Callao avenues, in the neighborhood of Balvanera. It is located just metres from the Palace of the Argentine National Congress. The station belonged to the inaugural section of the Buenos Aires Underground opened on 1 December 1913, which linked the stations Plaza Miserere and Plaza de Mayo.

Gallery

Nearby
 Argentine National Congress
 Congressional Plaza
 Confitería El Molino

References

External links

Buenos Aires Underground stations
Balvanera
Railway stations opened in 1913
1913 establishments in Argentina